Laura Raia (born May 12, 1993) professionally known as Moxie Raia, is an American singer-songwriter. She is of Italian descent. Her first mixtape 931 featuring artists like Pusha T, Wyclef Jean and Post Malone was released in March 2016. The second single from the mixtape, "On My Mind" featuring T, reached No. 42 on Spotify's Viral 50 tracks in March 2016.

Early life
Raia began her career as a professional dancer and songwriter before she was a teenager. At the age of 13, she moved to New York City and enrolled in the Professional Children's School. After studying jazz at Columbia University, Raia moved to Los Angeles and signed up with Capitol Records for a cover of Big Sean's "Beware".

Career
Shortly after signing up with Capitol, Raia released her first single, "Buffalo Bill". Moxie has an album, 931, featuring 10 songs.

In March 2016, she was named as an opening act for the North American leg of Justin Bieber's Purpose World Tour.

Discography

Album appearances

References

External links
Moxie Raia on SoundCloud
Moxie Raia on YouTube

1990 births
Living people
American hip hop singers
American women hip hop musicians
American women pop singers
American rhythm and blues singers
People from Red Bank, New Jersey
21st-century American women singers
21st-century American singers